Gaël Monfils was the defending champion, but chose not to defend his title.

With the loss of Ugo Humbert in the quarterfinals, this was the first tournament without a French champion since 2017 when Alexander Zverev won the title. It was also the first without a French finalist since 2004. David Goffin won the title, defeating Roberto Bautista Agut in the final, 5–7, 6–4, 6–2.

Seeds
The top four seeds received a bye into the second round.

Draw

Finals

Top half

Bottom half

Qualifying

Seeds

Qualifiers

Qualifying draw

First qualifier

Second qualifier

Third qualifier

Fourth qualifier

References

External links
 Main draw
 Qualifying draw

Singles